The castle of Neuscharfeneck is a ruin and a cultural monument above Ramberg and Dernbach on the territory of an exclave of Flemlingen in the district of Südliche Weinstraße in the west German state of Rhineland-Palatinate.

Location 
The ruins are situated in the eastern part of the Palatine Forest.

Layout 

The first castle, dating to the 13th century, was considerably smaller than the present ruins. Of the Hochstaufen castle only a few remnants have survived.

Within the shield wall there are relatively few usable passages, chambers and casemates. It therefore acted - apart from the hoarding (Plattform) that has not survived - primarily as passive protection for the castle behind it. The original entrance was over a drawbridge through the shield wall into the castle.

In the castle gardens, rare herbs such as White Henbane, Ingräu and Abbey Hysop were planted.

There is still a partially surviving gateway with a flanking tower. 

Gallery

References

Literature 
 
 Rolf Übel: Burg Neuscharfeneck bei Dernbach, Kreis Südliche Weinstraße. Verlag für Burgenkunde und Pfalzforschung, Landau, 1998 
 Alexander Thon (ed.): "... wie eine gebannte, unnahbare Zauberburg". Burgen in der Südpfalz. 2nd, improved ed., Regensburg, 2005, pp. 122–127. 
 Walter Herrmann: Auf Rotem Fels, pp. 150–155, Leinfelden-Echterdingen, 2004, 
 Jochen Goetze: Burgen in der Pfalz, pp. 46–50, Heidelberg, 1991,

External links 

 Castle entry in the scientific castle data bank of the European Institute of Castles (EBIDAT)
 Burgenwelt ("Castle World"
 Neuscharfeneck Castle
 Photographs of Neuscharfeneck Castle at burgenparadies.de
 Extract from the Palatine Castle Lexicon: Neuscharfeneck Castle

Castles in Rhineland-Palatinate
Südliche Weinstraße
Buildings and structures in the Palatinate Forest
Rock castles